"Te Felicito" ("I Congratulate You") is a song by Grupo Mojado and written by its lead member Felipe Barrientos for their studio album La Gorda (1992). It was later covered by Mexican actress and singer Laura Flores on her studio album, Nunca Hagas Llorar a Una Mujer (1995), which received airplay on the grupera charts in Mexico. It was also covered by Puerto Rican singer Jessica Cristina on her first merengue album, Me Gusta Todo de Ti (1996). Cristina's version reached #1 on the Billboard Tropical Airplay chart and was recognized as one of the best-performing Latin songs of the year at the 1998 BMI Latin Awards.

See also
List of Billboard Tropical Airplay number ones of 1996

References

1992 songs
1996 singles
Spanish-language songs